Jan Bártů (born 16 January 1955) is a Czech former modern pentathlete and coach who competed in the 1976 Summer Olympics and in the 1980 Summer Olympics. He won an individual bronze and a team silver at the 1976 Summer Games. He was coached by his father Karel Bártů, who competed for Czechoslovakia in modern pentathlon at the 1948 Summer Olympics. Jan secured his place at the 1976 Olympic Games at the age of 21 by finishing fourth in the 1976 Hungarian World Cup. He also finished second in the 1976 World Junior Championships, a few weeks after the Olympics. The success of Bártů and his team-mates at the Games represented the first major success in Modern Pentathlon for Czechoslovakia.

After retiring from competition, Jan Bártů went into coaching, serving as a coach at the High Performance Sport Centre Sparta Prague and later as the Technical Director of Czechoslovakian Pentathlon from 1986 to 1990, before becoming head coach for the Mexican National Modern Pentathlon team between 1990 and 1994. He took over the Head Coach position of the United States Pentathlon Association from 1995 to 1998. In April 1998 he joined Pentathlon GB as Performance Director: as of 2017 he led the British Team to winning five Olympic medals, including a gold for Steph Cook at the 2000 Olympics.

Bártů was awarded an honorary doctorate by the University of Bath in March 2017.

References

1955 births
Living people
Czech male modern pentathletes
Olympic modern pentathletes of Czechoslovakia
Czechoslovak male modern pentathletes
Modern pentathletes at the 1976 Summer Olympics
Modern pentathletes at the 1980 Summer Olympics
Olympic silver medalists for Czechoslovakia
Olympic bronze medalists for Czechoslovakia
Olympic medalists in modern pentathlon
Medalists at the 1976 Summer Olympics
Czech sports coaches
TeamBath coaches
Sportspeople from Prague